Politics and Policy is a peer-reviewed academic journal published six times a year by Wiley-Blackwell on behalf of the Policy Studies Organization, the Universidad Iberoamericana, Mexico City, the Alabama Political Science Association, the British Columbia Political Studies Association, the Georgia Political Science Association, the Great Plains Political Science Association, the Louisiana Political Science Association, the Mississippi Political Science Association, the New York State Political Science Association, the North Carolina Political Science Association, the Ohio Association of Economists and Political Scientists, and The Roosevelt Institution.  The journal was established in 1973 and the current editors-in-chief are Emma R. Norman (University of the Americas Puebla) and David Mena (Universidad Iberoamericana).  The journal publishes articles on public policy, political science, political history, political sociology, public administration, and international relations.

References

External links 
 

Wiley-Blackwell academic journals
English-language journals
Publications established in 1973
Political science journals
Bimonthly journals